Tadas Papečkys (born 28 September 1978 in Mariampolė) is a former Lithuanian footballer (defender). He previously played for FBK Kaunas, Žalgiris Kaunas, FC Anzhi Makhachkala, FK Šilutė, FK Riga, ŁKS Łódź and Górnik Zabrze.

Papečkys has made seven appearances for the Lithuania national football team.

Honours
National Team
 Baltic Cup
 2005

References

External links

Living people
1978 births
Lithuanian footballers
Lithuanian expatriate footballers
Lithuania international footballers
Górnik Zabrze players
ŁKS Łódź players
FBK Kaunas footballers
FC Anzhi Makhachkala players
Lithuanian people of Polish descent
Lithuanian expatriate sportspeople in Poland
Expatriate footballers in Poland
Expatriate footballers in Russia
Russian Premier League players
Association football defenders